Simone Hanselmann (born 6 December 1979) is a  German actress.

She started as a model and from 1998 to 1999, she played the role the bulimic schizophrenic model Anna Meisner (also Judith Unger and Susi) in the series Gute Zeiten, schlechte Zeiten.

Filmography

Films
2000: , as Lissy Schröder
2000: Girl
2001: 99 Euro – Der Hüpfer
2001: Zwei Engel auf Streife (Pilotfilm), as Laura Koslowski
2002: Schulmädchen (Pilotfilm), as Stella 
2002: Rosamunde Pilcher – Flammen der Liebe / Paradies der Träume, as Monica
2002: Click
2004: , as Tina Stein
2004: Alles außer Sex (Pilotfilm), as Edda
2005: 
2007: Reclaim Your Brain, as Anna
2007: Das Traumhotel: China, as Anna

Series
1998–1999: Gute Zeiten, schlechte Zeiten, as Anna Meisner/Judith Unger/Susi
2001–2002: Zwei Engel auf Streife, as Laura Koslowski
2002: Krista 
2003: Berlin, Berlin
2003: Unser Charly
2004: SOKO Kitzbühel, as Michelle Walter, Gastauftritt
2004: In aller Freundschaft
2004-2005: Schulmädchen, as Stella
2005-2007: Alles außer Sex, as Edda
2005: , as Britta Koch, Gastauftritt
2005/06: Tierärztin Dr. Mertens, as Alexandra
2008: Alarm für Cobra 11: "Schattenmann", as Prosecutor Saskia Ehrbach

Theatre
 Therapie zwecklos (Köln)
 Café Lichtenberg (Köln)

External links
 

1979 births
Living people
German film actresses
People from Mülheim
German female models
German stage actresses
German television actresses